Qari Fasihuddin Fitrat (Dari/) is an Afghan military commander who is the current Chief of Staff of the Islamic Emirate of Afghanistan. He has been a senior member of the Taliban.

Early life 
Qari Fasihuddin was born in Badakhshan Province and originated from Isterab, Warduj District. He belongs to the Tajik ethnic group and raised by religious family.

Military career 
In 2013, Qari Fasihuddin was appointed as the Taliban's shadow governor and head of the military commission in Badakhshan. In the same year, he firstly appeared in a Taliban propaganda video about the security situation in Badakhshan. In 2015, the Afghan Ministry of Interior falsely claimed that Qari Fasihuddin has been killed with 40 of his men, but the claim turned out to be propaganda.

On September 16, 2021 Fasihuddin was quoted as saying that:
"Afghanistan would have a regular, disciplined and strong army in near future to defend and protect the country and consultations in this field continue," Fasihuddin said at a gathering in Kabul," adding members of the proposed army would be well-trained.

References

Regular and disciplined army to be created

Living people
Afghan Tajik people
Year of birth missing (living people)
People from Badakhshan Province
Afghan military officers
Taliban commanders
Taliban leaders